Museum of Anthropology is one of the museums in Tehran province. It was founded in 1935 and houses works created by people from different cities of Iran during the Qajar dynasty and afterwards.

In 1968, the Museum of Anthropology was transferred from its former place in Abyaz Palace to Golestan Palace. The museum has workshops for calligraphy, photography, sculpture, carpentry as well as a library with a reading room. There are also a lecture hall and forty-seven booths for works assembled from all over Iran. Relics in the museum are classified and displayed in a thematic way. This museum is located in Golestan Palace.

Abyaz Palace 
This palace is one of the beautiful palaces located in the Golestan Palace complex (Tehran's Arg Square) Which today is visited by public as the Museum of Anthropology. 

At the end of the reign of Naser al-Din Shah Qajar , king Soltan Abdul Hamid II, the Sultan of Ottoman, sent some valuable and precious goods to the king of Iran. At that time almost all the palaces and royal halls were decorated with numerous high value paintings  and furniture, Hence, Naser al-Din Shah decided to build a new palace in the southwestern corner of the Golestan Palace to place souvenir gifts there.

The white color of the building's facade, which was painted in 18th-century European style together with its white marble stairs, the palace was called Abyaz,- meaning white in local language. From the very beginning, up until 1954, Abyaz palace was a place for government meetings. In 1965, in the process of the coronation of Mohammad Reza Shah Pahlavi, changes were made to the western side and the lower floor.  Since 1968 it has been used as the Museum of Anthropology.

Gallery

References

Museums
Tourist attractions in Tehran Province
Tourism in Tehran
Museums in Tehran